In differential geometry the last geometric statement of Jacobi is a conjecture named after Carl Gustav Jacob Jacobi. According to this conjecture:

Every caustic from any point  on an ellipsoid other than umbilical points has exactly four cusps.

While numerical experiments had indicated the statement is true, it wasn’t until 2004 that it was proven rigorously by Itoh and Kiyohara.

It has since been extended to a wider class of surfaces beyond the ellipsoid.

See also 

 Four-vertex theorem

References

Differential geometry
Algebraic geometry
Conjectures that have been proved